The Akan people of  Ghana frequently name their children after the day of the week they were born and the order in which they were born. These "day names" have further meanings concerning the soul and character of the person. Middle names have considerably more variety and can refer to their birth order, twin status, or an ancestor's middle name.

This naming tradition is shared throughout West Africa and the African diaspora. During the 18th–19th centuries, enslaved people in the Caribbean from the region that is modern-day Ghana were referred to as Coromantees. Many of the leaders of enslaved people's rebellions had "day names" including Cuffy, Cuffee or Kofi, Cudjoe or Kojo, Quao or Quaw, and Quamina or Kwame/Kwamina.

Most Ghanaians have at least one name from this system, even if they also have an English or Christian name. Notable figures with day names include Ghana's first president Kwame Nkrumah and former United Nations Secretary-General Kofi Annan.

In the official orthography of the Twi language, the Ashanti versions of these names as spoken in Kumasi are as follows. The diacritics on á a̍ à represent high, mid, and low tone (tone does not need to be marked on every vowel), while the diacritic on a̩ is used for vowel harmony and can be ignored. (Diacritics are frequently dropped in any case.) Variants of the names are used in other languages, or may represent different transliteration schemes. The variants mostly consist of different affixes (in Ashanti, kwa- or ko- for men and a- plus -a or -wa for women). For example, among the Fante, the prefixes are kwe-, kwa or ko for men and e-, arespectively. Akan d̩wo or jo(Fante) is pronounced something like English Joe, but there do appear to be two sets of names for those born on Monday.

Day names

Naming ceremony for twins among the Akan 
There are also special names for elder and younger twins.

The word Panyin means older/elder.  Kakra is short for Kakraba which means little/younger one.
The definition/description below for the meaning of younger and an elder are backwards or vice versa.

Birth-order names 
There are also names based on the order of birth, the order born after twins, and the order born after remarriage.

Special delivery
Children are also given names when delivered under special circumstances.

Family names 
Ashanti people given-names are concluded with a family name (surname) preceded by a given name. The family name (surname) are always given after close relatives and sometimes friends. Since Ashanti names are always given by the men, if a couple receives a son as their first born-baby then the son is named after the father of the husband and if the baby is a girl then she will be named after the mother of the  husband. As a result, if the man is called Osei Kofi and his wife gives birth to a girl as their first born, the girl may be called Yaa Dufie even if she was not born on Friday. The reason is that the  mother of the  husband (Osei Kofi) is called Yaa Dufie. The Ashanti people usually give these names so that the names of close relatives be maintained in the families to show the love for their families.

In the olden days of Ashanti it was a disgrace if an Ashanti man was not able to name any child after his father and/or  mother because that was the pride of every Ashanti household. Most of the ethnic-Ashanti family name (surname) given to boys could also be given to girls just by adding the letters "aa". Some Ashanti family names (surnames) can be given to both boys and girls without changing or adding anything. However, there are other ethnic-Ashanti family name (surnames) that are exclusively male names, while others are exclusively female names.

References

Additional references
 J. E. Redden and N. Owusu (1963, 1995). Twi Basic Course. Foreign Service Institute (Hippocrene reprint).
 Florence Abena Dolphyne (1996). A Comprehensive Course in Twi (Asante) for the Non-Twi Learner. Accra: Ghana Universities Press.  
 Akan Teleteaching course
 Aukan Library (Ndyuka)

See also
Ghanaian name

Akan given names
Akan language